Joseph William Brand (October 3, 1925 – May 23, 2003) was an American politician in the state of Montana who served in the Montana House of Representatives. He was Speaker pro tempore in 1983 and from 1979 to 1981.

References

1925 births
2003 deaths
People from Anaconda, Montana
Democratic Party members of the Montana House of Representatives
20th-century American politicians
People from Deer Lodge, Montana